The 2017 Channel One Cup was the 50th edition of the tournament. It was played between 13–17 December 2017. The Czech Republic, Finland, Sweden and Russia with the new teams of Canada (composed of European-contracted players and dubbed the "Z team") and South Korea were involved in the tournament.

Standings

Games
All times are local.
Moscow – (Moscow Time – UTC+3) Prague – (Central European Time – UTC+1)

References

Channel
Channel
Channel
Channel
Channel
Channel One Cup (ice hockey)
Channel One Cup
2017 in Moscow
2010s in Prague
Sports competitions in Prague